Lambert Lake is a village in unincorporated Lambert Lake Township, Washington County, Maine, United States. Lambert Lake had a post office until October 24, 1987; it still has its own ZIP code, 04454. The Eastern Maine Railway passes through the village of Lambert Lake.

References

Villages in Washington County, Maine
Villages in Maine